The 2003 Atlantic 10 Conference Baseball Championship was held at Dodd Stadium in Norwich, CT from May 15 through 17 (preliminaries) and at Pitt Field in Richmond, VA on May 22 and 24 (championship series). It featured the top two regular-season finishers of each six-team division, plus the next two best finishers. Top-seeded Richmond defeated Massachusetts in the title game to win the tournament for the first time, earning the Atlantic 10's automatic bid to the 2003 NCAA Tournament.

Seeding and format 
The league's top six teams, based on winning percentage in the 24-game regular season schedule, qualified for the field. The top two teams in each division qualified for the tournament automatically; the two division winners, Massachusetts in the East and Richmond in the West, received the top two seeds and byes through to the second round of the double elimination tournament. The tournament was different from most double-elimination formats in that after the two finalists were decided, losses were erased, and a best-of-three series was played at a new site the following weekend to decide the champion.

Bracket

All-Tournament Team 
The following players were named to the All-Tournament Team. Richmond's Vito Chairavalloti, one of six Spiders selected, was named Most Outstanding Player.

Richmond's David Reaver and Tim Stauffer, who had both been selected in 2002, were named for the second time.

References 

Tournament
Atlantic 10 Conference Baseball Tournament
Atlantic 10 Conference baseball tournament
Atlantic 10 Conference baseball tournament
Atlantic 10 Conference baseball tournament
21st century in Richmond, Virginia
College baseball tournaments in Connecticut
College baseball tournaments in Virginia
Norwich, Connecticut
Sports in Richmond, Virginia